Caryocolum is a genus of moths in the family Gelechiidae.

Distribution
The genus is distributed between 28° N and 68° N throughout the Palearctic realm and is also represented by a small number of species in the Nearctic realm. Most of the species occur in mountainous areas.

Selected species
The genus consists of the following species:
fischerella-group
Caryocolum fischerella (Treitschke, 1833)
tischeriella-group
Caryocolum tischeriella (Zeller, 1839)
alsinella-group
Caryocolum albifaciella (Heinemann, 1870)
Caryocolum alsinella (Zeller, 1868)
Caryocolum viscariella (Stainton, 1855)
Caryocolum vicinella (Douglas, 1851) 
Caryocolum bosalella (Rebel, 1936)
Caryocolum anatolicum Huemer, 1989
sciurella-group
Caryocolum sciurella (Walsingham, 1908)
nepalense-group
Caryocolum nepalense Povolny, 1968
Caryocolum longiusculum Huemer, 1988
Caryocolum vartianorum Huemer, 1988
tetrameris-group
Caryocolum tetrameris (Meyrick, 1926)
Caryocolum paghmanum Huemer, 1988
mongolense-group
Caryocolum mongolense Povolny, 1969
amaurella-group
Caryocolum amaurella (Hering, 1924)
Caryocolum crypticum Huemer, Karsholt & Mutanen, 2014
Caryocolum iranicum Huemer, 1989
oculatella-group 
Caryocolum oculatella (Thomann, 1930)
petryi-group 
Caryocolum petryi (Hofmann, 1899)
Caryocolum afghanum Huemer, 1988
Caryocolum majus Huemer, 1988
Caryocolum splendens Povolny, 1977
Caryocolum dilatatum Huemer, 1989
Caryocolum spinosum Huemer, 1989
saginella-group 
Caryocolum inflativorella (Klimesch, 1938)
Caryocolum saginella (Zeller, 1868) 
Caryocolum cauligenella (Schmid, 1863)
trauniella-group
Caryocolum trauniella (Zeller, 1868)
Caryocolum peregrinella (Herrich-Schaffer, 1854)
Caryocolum delphinatella (Constant, 1890)
provinciella-group
Caryocolum provinciella (Stainton, 1869) 
mucronatella-group
Caryocolum mucronatella (Chretien, 1900) 
Caryocolum simulans Huemer, 1988
leucomelanella-group
Caryocolum abhorrens Huemer, 1988
Caryocolum leucomelanella (Zeller, 1839) 
Caryocolum immixtum Huemer, 1988
Caryocolum leucothoracellum (Klimesch, 1953) 
Caryocolum schleichi (Christoph, 1872)
Caryocolum albithoracellum Huemer, 1989
Caryocolum similellum Huemer, 1989
marmoreum-group 
Caryocolum marmoreum (Haworth, 1828)
Caryocolum pullatella (Tengstrom, 1848) 
Caryocolum protectum (Braun, 1965) 
stramentella-group
Caryocolum stramentella (Rebel, 1935)
fraternella-group
Caryocolum hispanicum Huemer, 1988
Caryocolum confluens Huemer, 1988
Caryocolum fraternella (Douglas, 1851) 
interalbicella-group
Caryocolum klosi (Rebel, 1917)
Caryocolum interalbicella (Herrich-Schaffer, 1854)
Caryocolum laceratella (Zeller, 1868)
Caryocolum nearcticum Huemer, 1988
Caryocolum blandella (Douglas, 1852) 
Caryocolum blandelloides Karsholt, 1981
Caryocolum horoscopa (Meyrick, 1926)
Caryocolum jaspidella (Chretien, 1908)
Caryocolum proximum (Haworth, 1828)
Caryocolum blandulella (Tutt, 1887)
Caryocolum tricolorella (Haworth, 1812)
Caryocolum fibigerium Huemer, 1988
Caryocolum junctella (Douglas, 1851)
Caryocolum kasyi Huemer, 1988
Caryocolum transiens Huemer, 1992
extremum-group
Caryocolum extremum Huemer, 1988
cassella-group
Caryocolum cassella (Walker, 1864)
huebneri-group
Caryocolum moehringiae (Klimesch, 1954)
Caryocolum petrophilum (Preissecker, 1914)
Caryocolum huebneri (Haworth, 1828)
Caryocolum kroesmanniella (Herrich-Schaffer, 1854)
unknown group
Caryocolum arenbergeri Huemer, 1989
Caryocolum baischi Huemer & Karsholt, 2010
Caryocolum dauphini Grange & Nel, 2012
Caryocolum divergens Huemer, 1989
Caryocolum gallagenellum Huemer, 1989
Caryocolum leucofasciatum Huemer, 1989
Caryocolum mazeli Huemer & Nel, 2005
Caryocolum repentis Huemer & Luquet, 1992
Caryocolum siculum Bella, 2008
Caryocolum srnkai Huemer & Karsholt, 2011

Possible species
Caryocolum crepusculella (Teich, 1889)
Caryocolum trinella (Fuchs, 1903)

References

  2008: Caryocolum siculum sp. n. (Gelechiidae), feeding on Gypsophila (Caryophyllaceae) in Sicily. Nota Lepidopterologica 31 (1): 69-75.

External links
 Caryocolum at funet

 
Gnorimoschemini